Billy Greulich-Smith (born 24 April 1991) is an English footballer who plays for Shildon.

Playing career
Greulich had a varied career as a youth player. He was at the academies of Watford, Middlesbrough and Sunderland. During his time at Middlesbrough he was part of the successful U13 team that won the prestigious Cascais Tournament in Portugal

Following his release from Sunderland he signed as a youth team player with Luton Town but was unfortunate to see his contract cancelled when Luton went into Administration
 
He ended up at Northern Football League side Brandon United before the end of his teenage years. After a trial with Hartlepool United in summer 2009, he made it into The Football League, signing his first professional contract with the club in August 2009.

He made his debut in a 1–0 home win over Tranmere Rovers on 24 October 2009, replacing Adam Boyd in the 73rd minute.

Greulich made a further three substitute appearances over the following six weeks, following an injury crisis at the club. Having gained first-team experience, he signed a new contract at the end of the season.

In May 2011 Greulich was not offered a new contract by the club, along with nine other players, and was released.

Moving back into non-league football, Greulich joined Durham City, of the Northern Premier League for the 2011–12 season; by the time of his transfer to Shildon in January 2012, he had scored 4 goals in 24 league appearances for Durham.

He joined Shildon early in 2012, and enjoyed a more prolific second half of the season than his first, scoring 6 goals in 14 appearances for the club.

Career statistics
(Correct as of 15 May 2012)

Listed in the "Other" column are one appearance, without scoring, for Durham City in the 2011–12 League Challenge Cup; 4 appearances and one goal for Durham in the 2011-12 FA Trophy and a further goalless appearance in the 2011–12 Durham Senior Cup.

References

External links
Profile at the Official Hartlepool United site

1991 births
Living people
English footballers
Association football forwards
Middlesbrough F.C. players
Sunderland A.F.C. players
Luton Town F.C. players
Watford F.C. players
Brandon United F.C. players
Hartlepool United F.C. players
Durham City A.F.C. players
Shildon A.F.C. players
English Football League players
Northern Premier League players